The Education of Memphis is home to a range of public and private institutions serving various educational needs of  Memphis, Tennessee. At the primary and secondary levels, the metropolitan area is currently served by the Shelby County Schools operating system including the surrounding suburbs, a number of private schools, and some with religious affiliations. Major post-secondary institutions include the Southwest Tennessee Community College, the University of Memphis, Christian Brothers University, Rhodes College and the University of Tennessee Health Science Center.

Private schools

Bishop Byrne High School
Briarcrest Christian School
Christian Brothers High School
Concord Academy
Evangelical Christian School
First Assembly Christian School
Grace-St. Luke’s Episcopal School
Hutchison School
Harding Academy
Immaculate Conception Cathedral High School
Lausanne Collegiate School
Margolin Hebrew Academy/Feinstone Yeshiva of the South MHA/FYOS
Memphis Catholic High School
Memphis Jewish High School
Memphis University School
Presbyterian Day School (PDS)
Saint Benedict at Auburndale High School
St. Agnes Academy-St. Dominic School
St. Mary's Episcopal School
Westminster Academy (Tennessee)
Woodland Presbyterian School (Memphis, Tennessee)

Colleges and universities
Baptist College of Health Sciences
Christian Brothers University
LeMoyne-Owen College
Memphis College of Art
Rhodes College (formerly Southwestern at Memphis)
Southern College of Optometry
Southwest Tennessee Community College
Union University - Germantown campus, (Memphis Teacher Residency)
University of Memphis (formerly Memphis State University)
University of Tennessee Health Science Center (Colleges of Dentistry, Medicine, Nursing, Pharmacy, Graduate Health Sciences and Allied Health Sciences).
Victory University (closed, 2014)

Seminaries
Memphis School of Preaching
Memphis Theological Seminary
Mid-America Baptist Theological Seminary
Harding School of Theology

St. Jude Children's Research Hospital
Memphis is also home to St. Jude Children's Research Hospital, a world class medical research facility.

1996 Nobel Laureate Peter C. Doherty conducts research at this facility. There are also several other major medical teaching institutions in the city, including the University of Tennessee Health Science Center (Colleges of Medicine, Dentistry, Pharmacy and Allied Health Sciences), the Southern College of Optometry and the Baptist Memorial College of Health Sciences.

History

The Memphis Training School for Nurses, progenitor of the School of Nursing, was chartered September 28, 1887.

The University of Tennessee College of Dentistry was founded in 1878 making it the oldest dental college in the South, and the third oldest public college of dentistry in the United States.

The Christian Brothers High School Band is the oldest high school band in America, founded in 1872.

References